Stuart Wood may refer to:
Stuart Wood (police commissioner) (1889–1966), ninth Commissioner of the Royal Canadian Mounted Police
Stuart Wood (musician) (born 1957), guitarist of the Bay City Rollers
Stuart Wood (cricketer) (born 1939), English cricketer
Stuart Wood (lawyer), Australian barrister
Stuart Wood (canoeist) (born 1994), British paracanoeist